The Bowman Homestead  in North Versailles Township, Allegheny County, Pennsylvania is a -story brick farmhouse built in 1846 by George Bowman in a combination of the Western Pennsylvania vernacular and Greek Revival styles.  Timber for the house was harvested on site, and the bricks were fired nearby.

Bowman moved to Western Pennsylvania in the early 1800s and married Eliza Mellon, the sister of Judge Thomas Mellon and aunt of Andrew Mellon, the future Secretary of the Treasury.

It was listed on the National Register of Historic Places in 1979.

References

Houses on the National Register of Historic Places in Pennsylvania
Greek Revival houses in Pennsylvania
Houses in Allegheny County, Pennsylvania
National Register of Historic Places in Allegheny County, Pennsylvania
1846 establishments in Pennsylvania
Houses completed in 1846